The Towamba River bridge is a heritage-listed road bridge that carries Towamba Road across the Towamba River at New Buildings, New South Wales, Australia. The bridge is owned by Transport for NSW. The bridge is also called the New Buildings Bridge over Towamba River. It was added to the New South Wales State Heritage Register on 20 June 2000.

History 

The current timber low-level bridge was built  following the destruction of the previous bridge in a major flood in 1919. The bridge carries motor vehicles and, via a grade-separated path, carries both pedestrians and bicycles.

The bridge was closed for repairs for several weeks in 2017 following issues discovered in routine inspections.

Heritage listing 
The New Buildings Bridge over Towamba River was listed on the New South Wales State Heritage Register on 20 June 2000.

See also 

 List of bridges in Australia

References

Attribution

External links 

 

New South Wales State Heritage Register
Road bridges in New South Wales
Articles incorporating text from the New South Wales State Heritage Register
Bega Valley Shire
Bridges completed in 1920
1920 establishments in Australia
Wooden bridges in Australia